Brower is an English surname. Notable people with the surname include:

 Ann Brower, American-New Zealand academic 
 Brittany Brower, contestant in America's Next Top Model, 2005
 Charles H. Brower (1901–1984), American advertising  executive, copywriter, and author
 Charles N. Brower, American judge
 David R. Brower (1912–2000), American environmentalist 
 Edna Brower (1901–1951), first wife of John Diefenbaker, 13th Prime Minister of Canada
 Frank Brower (1823–1874), American blackface performer
 Jacob V. Brower, Minnesota writer and politician
 Jim Brower (born 1972), American Major League Baseball pitcher
 Kenneth Brower, American environmental writer
 Louis Brower (1900–1994), American Major League Baseball player
 Ned Brower (born 1978), American drummer, actor, and model
 Pearl Kiyawn Nageak Brower, American academic administrator

See also
 Brewer
 Brauer
 Brawer
 Brouwer
 Browser (disambiguation)

English-language surnames